Don Darcey (born 29 August 1934) is  a former Australian rules footballer who played with Footscray in the Victorian Football League (VFL).

Notes

External links 
		

Living people
1934 births
Australian rules footballers from Western Australia
Western Bulldogs players
South Fremantle Football Club players